The International Congregational Fellowship is an international coordinating body formed in 1995 from among those Congregationalist groups that had not joined with other reformed churches during the heyday of ecumenical mergers in the 1960s and 1970s.

Members and affiliated bodies
Congregational Federation of Australia and New Zealand
Congregational Federation
National Association of Congregational Christian Churches
Union of Welsh Independents

References

External links

Congregationalism
Calvinist organizations
Christian organizations established in the 20th century
Christian organizations established in 1995